Cornufer batantae is a species of frog in the family Ceratobatrachidae. It is endemic to West Papua, Indonesia, and is known from two islands near the New Guinean mainland, Batanta and Waigeo. There are also unconfirmed records from Yapen and Gag Islands. Common name Batanta wrinkled ground frog has been coined for the species.

Description
Adult males measure  and adult females  in snout–vent length, based on two males and two females in the type series. The snout is bluntly pointed, and the canthus is distinct but rounded. The tympanum is distinct. The supratympanic fold is strong. The dorsal surfaces are finely tuberculate. The back bears several narrow, elongate, dermal folds. The ground color of the dorsal surfaces is light to dark brown. Indistinct darker bars and spots are present on the upper lip; the supratympanic fold and some dorsal skin folds are dark brown. However, this markings are not visible in the dark brown specimen, apart from the dark supratympanic mark. The hind limbs have indistinct dark cross bars. The ventral surfaces are pale.

The male advertisement call consist of a small number (4–8) of pulses, repeated at 132–226 pulses/s and lasting for 30–42 milliseconds.

Habitat and conservation
Cornufer batantae is presumably a lowland forest species. Development is direct, without free-living tadpole stage. The eggs are laid on the ground.

Cornufer batantae is a poorly known species. On Waigeo, it is threatened by habitat loss caused by logging. It is not known to occur in any protected area.

References

batantae
Endemic fauna of Indonesia
Amphibians of Western New Guinea
Taxa named by Richard G. Zweifel
Amphibians described in 1969
Taxonomy articles created by Polbot